Doug McKinty is a Canadian retired soccer defender who played professionally with the Vancouver 86ers and earned one cap with the  Canada men's national soccer team.

Club career
In 1987, McKinty joined the newly established Vancouver 86ers in the Canadian Soccer League.  From 1988 to 1991, Vancouver dominated the CSL, winning four consecutive league championships.  When the CSL collapsed following the 1992 season, McKinty and his teammates moved to the American Professional Soccer League.  McKinty remained with Vancouver until at least 1995.

International career
In 1986 and 1987, McKinty earned five caps with the Canadian U-20 national team as it qualified for the 1987 FIFA World Youth Championship. He did not enter any of the Canadian games in that tournament. 

McKinty also represented Canada at the 1987 Pan American Games. On April 2, 1992, McKinty earned his lone cap with the senior Canadian national team in a 5–2 win over China.

References

External links
 

Living people
1968 births
Sportspeople from Nanaimo
Soccer people from British Columbia
American Professional Soccer League players
Canadian soccer players
Canada men's international soccer players
Canada men's youth international soccer players
Canadian Soccer League (1987–1992) players
Vancouver Whitecaps (1986–2010) players
Association football defenders
Pan American Games competitors for Canada
Footballers at the 1987 Pan American Games